Mikhail Mamistov (born 26 April 1961, in Leningrad), is a Russian  powered and glider aerobatic pilot.

Glider Aerobatics

He won the FAI World Glider Aerobatic Championships 1995 and 1997, and the FAI European Glider Aerobatic Championships 1996.

Powered Aerobatics

In 2001 he won the FAI World (Powered) Aerobatic Championships and World Air Games Powered Aerobatic Championships. In 2006 and 2008 he won the FAI European (Powered) Aerobatic Championships. In September 2017, he won the World Aerobatic Championship in Malelane, South Africa, flying the Extra 330SC.

See also
 Competition aerobatics
 FAI World Aerobatic Championships
 FAI European Aerobatic Championships

References

Aerobatic pilots
Glider pilots
Russian aviators
1961 births
Living people